Francisco Pelló Hernandis (12 August 1935 – 12 May 2021) was a Spanish-born Argentine painter, sculptor, and poet.

Awards and honors
 Medalla de Plata del certamen de pintura de Amigos del Arte, Rosario, 1951.
 Premio Nacional de Excelencia Humana, 1999.
 Premio «El ceibo de la amistad rioplatense» del Rotary International, Montevideo, 2000.
 «Artista distinguido de la ciudad de Rosario» del Consejo Municipal de la Ciudad, 2005.
 «“Santafesino Notable”» de la Cámara de Diputados de la provincia de Santa Fe, 2014.

References

1935 births
2021 deaths
Argentine painters
Argentine sculptors
20th-century Argentine male artists
21st-century Argentine male artists
Male sculptors
Argentine poets
Spanish painters
Spanish sculptors
Spanish poets
Spanish emigrants to Argentina
People from Ribera Alta (comarca)